Günter Hans Lamprecht (21 January 1930 – 4 October 2022) was a German film and stage actor, best-known internationally for his leading role in the Fassbinder miniseries Berlin Alexanderplatz (1980) and as a ship captain in the epic war film Das Boot (1981).

Life and career
Lamprecht was born in Berlin, the son of a taxi driver. After training at the Max Reinhardt Seminar, he had his first theatre engagement at the Schauspielhaus Bochum. He joined the Theater Oberhausen in 1959, and remained with them until 1961. His roles there included Stanley Kowalski in A Streetcar Named Desire and John in Gerhart Hauptmann's The Rats.

Lamprecht began appearing on television in the 1960s. He was cast in the series Kara Ben Nemsi Effendi, which ran from 1973 to 1975. His first film role was in Ottokar Runze's  (1975). He played the leading role in the 1979 TV movie Frontiers of Darkness (Schattengrenze).

In 1973, filmmaker Rainer Werner Fassbinder cast Lamprecht in his series World on a Wire. He recruited him again for The Marriage of Maria Braun (1979). Fassbinder then gave Lamprecht the lead role of Franz Biberkopf in his acclaimed 1980 miniseries Berlin Alexanderplatz, based on Alfred Döblin's 1929 novel of the same name. Turner Classic Movies wrote of his performance: "Lamprecht was quite extraordinary as the hapless center of gravity as Biberkopf is drawn into and betrayed by Berlin's underworld in the days spanning from the end of WWI to the Nazi era." The role won him Best Actor at the Munich Film Festival, and he came in third place at the American National Society of Film Critics Awards.

Lamprecht had a role in the World War II submarine film Das Boot (1981), playing the captain of the SS Weser, and continued to appear regularly on German television.

Personal life
In 1999, Lamprecht and his partner, actress Claudia Amm, were badly injured in a mass shooting.

Lamprecht's memoirs, And Sadly I'm Still: A Youth in Berlin was published in 2000, where he discusses his experiences in Nazi Germany and the postwar years. His second book, A Hellish Thing, Life was published in 2007. He died on 4 October 2022 in Bad Godesberg at the age of 92.

Filmography

References

External links

1930 births
2022 deaths
20th-century German male actors
21st-century German male actors
Male actors from Berlin
German male film actors
German male television actors
German male stage actors
Recipients of the Order of Merit of Berlin
Members of the Order of Merit of North Rhine-Westphalia
Officers Crosses of the Order of Merit of the Federal Republic of Germany